Lawrence Andrew Reid (often known as Laurie Reid) is an American linguist who specializes in Austronesian languages, particularly on the morphosyntax and historical linguistics of the Philippine languages.

Education
Reid graduated with an MA in Linguistics in 1964 from the University of Hawaii. He obtained his doctorate from the University of Hawaii in 1966. He also studied music at the University of Canterbury in Christchurch, New Zealand, and theology at Commonwealth Bible College in Brisbane, Australia.

Career
Reid was a long-time lecturer at the University of Hawaii.

He also written many papers on Formosan languages.

Publications
Reid has published numerous books, articles, reviews, and translations. His books include An Ivatan Syntax; Central Bontoc: Sentence, Paragraph and Discourse Structures; Philippine Minor Languages: Word Lists and Phonologies; Bontok-English Dictionary; and Guinaang Bontok Texts.

An Ivatan syntax (1966)
Central Bontoc: Sentence, paragraph and discourse (1970)
Philippine Minor Languages (1971)
Bontok-English dictionary, with English-Bontok finder list (1976)
Philippine linguistics: The State of the art: 1970–1980 (1981)
The demise of Proto-Philippines (1982)
Guinaang Bontok texts (1992)
Morphological evidence for Austric (1994)
Guide to Isinay Orthography (2016)

References

Living people
Linguists of Austronesian languages
Linguists from the United States
University of Hawaiʻi alumni
Linguists of Philippine languages
University of Hawaiʻi faculty
Year of birth missing (living people)
Historical linguists